New York's 19th State Assembly district is one of the 150 districts in the New York State Assembly. It has been represented by Republican Ed Ra since 2011.

Geography
District 19 is in Nassau County. It contains parts of the towns of Hempstead, North Hempstead and Oyster Bay.

Recent election results

2022

2020

2018

2016

2014

2012

References

19
Nassau County, New York